Rushan is a county-level city in the prefecture-level city of Weihai, Shandong province, People's Republic of China. Located on the Shandong Peninsula, Rushan borders Yantai to the north and looks out to the Yellow Sea to the south.

It derives its name from a breast-shaped hill on the seashore.

History
Rushan City has a long history. The first county in Rushan City was founded in 206 B.C. and named "Yuli".

Administrative divisions
The county-level city of Rushan administers 1 subdistricts and 14 towns.
Subdistricts
Chengqu Subdistrict

Towns

Geography and climate
It is located on the south-eastern seashore of Shandong Province in China at 36°7′ northern latitude and 121°5′ east of Greenwich.

Rushan has a mild, seasonal climate moderated by the Yellow Sea.

It is within a two-hour flight from major Chinese cities such as Beijing and Shanghai. Large and medium-sized cities around it are Qingdao, Yantai and Weihai, all within one-hour-drive from Rushan. Qingdao-Weihai Expressway, State Highway 309 and the Taocun–Weihai railway run across Rushan. In the future, the city will be served by the Laixi–Rongcheng high-speed railway.

Economy
Rushan has fulfilled 31.31 billion RMB Yuan of GDP (around five billion US dollars and about $9000 per capita) in 2010. The total fixed asset investment was 19.01 RMB Yuan and the local fiscal revenue reached 1.33 billion RMB Yuan. Rushan is thus ranked No. 55 among all the Chinese counties in terms of economic competitiveness.

With a coast of 185 kilometers long, Rushan is known for its varieties of shellfishes and rare fish species. The annual seafood production is more than 200 thousand tons. Rich in hilly land, Rushan becomes the principal fruit producing base in Jiaodong Peninsula. It is also abundant in gold and silver, producing over five tons of gold each year, which makes it the 5th biggest gold producing county/city in China and wins it the good reputation of “Gold Ridge and Silver Beach” in China.

Rushan has many scenic spots such as Silver Beach Resort and Da Rushan Coastal Resort (both are AAAA scenic spots at state level), Juyushan National Forest Park, Tangshang Hot Spring and Shengshui Palace (a Holy Land of Taoism).

Education
Major elementary schools include: Rushan Number One Experimental Elementary School, Huangshanlu Elementary School, and Rushan Number Two Experimental Elementary School.
Major middle schools include: Rushan Fuqian Middle School and Rushan Yiyuan Middle School.
Major high schools include: Rushan Number One High School and Rushan Golden Mountain High School.

See also
Breast-shaped hill

References

External links
  Rushan Government Website
 English Propaganda Film "Happy Rushan, A Mecca for Mother Love" 

Cities in Shandong
Weihai